The 2014–15 Svenska Cupen is the 59th season of Svenska Cupen and the third season with the current format. The winners of the competition will earn a place in the second qualifying round of the 2015–16 UEFA Europa League, unless they have already qualified for European competition, in which case the qualification spot will go to another team, determined by a number of factors.

A total of 96 clubs will enter the competition. IF Elfsborg are the defending champions, having beaten Helsingborgs IF 1–0 in last season's final.

The only two associations of the Swedish District Football Associations that had a qualifying tournament were Dalarnas FF and Örebro Läns FF, the other districts decided their teams by Distriktsmästerskap (District Championships) or by club ranking 2013.

Qualified teams

Dalarnas FF qualification 
The first round commenced on 13 March 2014 and the final was contested on 28 May 2014. The five highest ranked teams entered teams entered in the quarter-finals. The number in brackets, indicate what tier of Swedish football each team competed in for the 2014 season.

Örebro Läns FF qualification 
The first match was played on 5 March 2014 and the last match was played on 13 May 2014. The number in brackets, indicate what tier of Swedish football each team competed in for the 2014 season.

Group 1

Group 2

Group 3

Final round 
The winners of the final round entered the first round of 2014–15 Svenska Cupen.

Footnotes

References

External links
 Official site 

2014-15 Q
Cupen Q